Kingsley Beatty Gibbs (Brooklyn Heights, New York, July 25, 1810 — St. Augustine, Florida (?), October 18, 1859), described as "an unusually quiet man with easy manners and a soft low voice,"is most remembered for being a nephew of slave trader Zephaniah Kingsley, in fact Kingsley's leading white relative. In 1833 he married Ana Eduarda Teresa Hernández, but she died after three years, leaving no issue. Later he married Laura Williams, and they had two children.

Gibbs' first position was Deputy Clerk of the Duval County, Florida, Superior Court. He was elected an alderman of St. Augustine in 1835. In 1836 and 1837 he was a member of the Florida militia. When in 1839 Kingsley sold his Fort George Plantation and moved his complex mixed-"race" family to Haiti, Gibbs purchased it. He farmed the plantation, using slave labor, and was elected to the Territorial Legislature. He was reported as opposed to Florida statehood. In 1846 his name appeared in the paper for helping shipwreck victims. In 1851, giving his address as Mayport Mills, Duval County, he advertised the products of the United States Mutual Insurance Company. In 1852 he sold the plantation and moved to St. Augustine, where he was again an alderman on the city council from 1854 to 1856.

When Kingsley died in 1843, Gibbs, an executor of his will, inherited  in St. Johns County, the books from his library, his weapons, the schooner "North Carolina", and one twelfth of the estate, including slaves. He was also named guardian of Kingsley's minor children.

It was about this time that he built a mill called Mayport Mill near the mouth of the St. Johns River, giving the location the name, Mayport, that it bears today.

Shortly before his death he wrote memoirs covering in some detail life at the plantation, which indirectly illuminate Kingsley's era. By good fortune this then-unidentified manuscript reached the park manager at the Kingsley Plantation State Historic Site, and it has been published and annotated.

No visual image of Gibbs is known.

References

1810 births
1859 deaths
People from St. Augustine, Florida
American slave owners
Zephaniah Kingsley
People from Brooklyn
American planters
American businesspeople in insurance
Members of the Florida House of Representatives